Andreyuk is a surname. Notable people with the surname include:

 Alexei Andreyuk (born 1959), Belarusian architect
 Vyacheslav Andreyuk (1945–2010), Soviet footballer
 Yelena Andreyuk (born 1958), Soviet volleyball player

Russian-language surnames